Apium (including celery and the marshworts) is a genus of about 20 species of flowering plants in the family Apiaceae, with a subcosmopolitan distribution in Europe, Asia, Africa, South America and Australia. They are medium to tall biennials or perennials growing up to 1 m high in the wet soil of marshes and salt marshes, and have pinnate to bipinnate leaves and small white flowers in compound umbels. Some species are edible, notably Apium graveolens, which includes the commercially important vegetables celery, celeriac and Chinese celery. Apium bermejoi from the island of Menorca is one of the rarest plants in Europe, with fewer than 100 individuals left.

The genus is the type genus of the family Apiaceae and the order Apiales.

Species
, Plants of the World Online accepted the following species:
Apium annuum P.S.Short
Apium australe Thouars
Apium chilense Hook. & Arn.
Apium commersonii DC.
Apium fernandezianum Johow
Apium graveolens L. - celery, wild celery
Apium insulare P.S.Short - Flinder's Island celery
Apium larranagum M.Hiroe
Apium panul (Bertero ex DC.) Reiche
Apium prostratum Labill. ex Vent.
Apium santiagoensis M.Hiroe
Apium sellowianum H.Wolff

Species formerly placed in this genus include:
Apium bermejoi → Helosciadium bermejoi
Apium leptophyllum → Cyclospermum leptophyllum - marsh parsley, or fir-leafed celery
Apium nodiflorum → Helosciadium nodiflorum - fool's water cress
Apium repens → Helosciadium repens - creeping marshwort

Ecology
Apium species, including garden celery, are eaten by the larvae of some Lepidoptera species including angle shades, common swift, Hypercompe icasia, the nutmeg, setaceous Hebrew character and turnip moth.

References

External links
Jepson Manual Treatment
USDA Plants Profile

 
Apioideae genera
Taxa named by Carl Linnaeus